The United States Penitentiary, McCreary (USP McCreary) is a high-security United States federal prison for male inmates in unincorporated McCreary County, Kentucky. It is operated by the Federal Bureau of Prisons, a division of the United States Department of Justice. The facility also has an adjacent minimum-security satellite camp for male offenders.

Facility and programs
The Education Department at USP McCreary offers a wide variety of academic and vocational programs ranging from Adult Literacy to post-secondary studies through correspondence. All programs are voluntary with the exception of General Education Development (GED) 
and English as a Second Language (ESL) classes. A representative from the Education Department interviews each inmate shortly after their arrival at the institution to determine their educational needs and goals. An inmate who does not have a verifiable high school diploma or GED is required to attend 240 hours of GED classes. For inmates who cannot proficiently speak English, mandatory attendance in ESL classes is required until the inmate is able to pass a certification test.

Notable incidents
Two correction officers at USP McCreary were stabbed on November 8, 2010. A prison spokesperson told The Associated Press that the officers were conducting routine cell searches when an inmate attacked them with a homemade prison knife. The officers were taken to a local hospital with what officials called serious but non-life-threatening injuries to the chest, back and shoulder. They were later released after treatment. An investigation identified the assailant as 38-year-old James Edward Rose, an inmate with a lengthy criminal history who was serving a sentence for armed bank robbery and witness tampering. Rose was convicted of attempted murder in 2011 and sentenced to life in prison. He is currently being held at the United States Penitentiary, Florence ADX, the federal supermax prison in Colorado which holds inmates who pose the highest security risks and require the tightest controls.

On October 15, 2013, WBIR-TV, an NBC affiliate in Knoxville, reported that 350 federal employees, primarily correctional officers, were working without pay during the 2013 federal government shutdown. The story quoted Don Peace, an employee at USP McCreary and president of the American Federation of Government Employees local, "There are probably 1,700 inmates behind the wall. The staff is putting their life literally on the line every time they come to work and go behind that fence. You don't know if you're going to walk out at night or not and now they're asking us to do that for free or for an IOU. This job is already stressful enough without all of these added things we have no control over." While the correctional officers and other prison employees worked for free, the inmates continued receiving pay for their labor during the shutdown. The shutdown ended on October 17, 2013.

Notable inmates

See also

List of U.S. federal prisons
Federal Bureau of Prisons
Incarceration in the United States

References

External links
 USP McCreary

McCreary
Prisons in Kentucky
Buildings and structures in McCreary County, Kentucky